Ieu Koeus (1905 – 14 January 1950) was a Cambodian politician. He served as President of the National Assembly of Cambodia from 1946 to 1949, and as Prime Minister of Cambodia for nine days in September 1949. Considered an intellectual, he was instrumental in the formation of the  Cambodian Democratic Party in April 1946, created a self-declared government on September 20, 1949, was replaced by Yem Sambaur on September 29.

On 14 January 1950, a hand grenade was thrown into the party headquarters, fatally wounding Koeus, who led the National Union Movement.  The man throwing the grenade was captured and arrested, admitting, then later denying, that he was a member of the opposing Liberal party.  Blame for the assassination, however, varies from the French, King Sihanouk, Yem Sambaur, and rebel Issaraks with little evidence available. Koeus' son Ieu Pannakar was a Cambodian senator.

References

World Statesmen - Cambodia

 

Cambodian politicians
Assassinated Cambodian politicians
Presidents of the National Assembly (Cambodia)
Interior ministers of Cambodia 
People murdered in Cambodia
Deaths by explosive device
People from Battambang province
Democratic Party (Cambodia) politicians
Prime Ministers of Cambodia
1905 births
1950 deaths
Cambodian Buddhists
20th-century Cambodian politicians